Charley ATL was an Azerbaijani progressive art rock band formed in 1987.

History 
Charley ATL was founded in 1987. Their only released album was "Dedicated to victims of Indian Cinema" in 1990. Their style were often compared to King Crimson, Dire Straits and Deep Purple by then in Azerbaijani rock magazine (samizdat) "Rokoko" which was founded itself by band member - Vahid Mustafayev (brother of Chingiz Mustafayev). Their major appearance on stage was during "Rokoko" rock music festival which took place in September, 1991 in Green Theatre. Their first and only music video "Körpə" (Baby) was released in 1993 and was circulated in ANS TV till 1998. Whilst most of bands then sang in Russian, Charley ATL was singing in Azerbaijani. They style derived from folk as well, tar was used as an instrument. Lyrics were heavily sarcastic. Band was eventually split up in 1995 and most of their members left to work in ANS TV.

Present 
In May 2017, former band members Stas Kalashnikov, Pavel Bulak, Rafig Velimetov and other musicians including Teymur Nadir, Yashar Bakhish and Rafig Muzaffarli rearranged and shoot video clip for "Gözəl çöllər" (Beautiful Steppes) on occasion of 50th birthday of Gunduz 'Bakili' Suleymanov.

Members

Aftermath 
 Pavel Bulak - moved to Moscow and began working on his own project SadFat.
 Stas Kalashnikov - moved to Moscow and founded KalashnikovBand in 2005.
 Isgandar Alasgerov - joined to band OZAN and Rast & HezzBand.

Discography

Links 
 Music video for "Körpə"

References

Azerbaijani progressive rock groups
Azerbaijani rock music groups
Soviet rock music groups